Richard Kaye is a British racing driver.

Richard Kaye may also refer to:
Sir Richard Kaye, 6th Baronet (1736–1809), English churchman and scientist

See also
Richard Kay (disambiguation)